Liotina is a genus of sea snails, marine gastropod mollusks in the family Liotiidae.

Description
The solid, cancellated shell has a  subdiscoidal shape. Its umbilicus is large, with a spiral funiculum. The aperture is not nacreous. The peristome is varicose, reflected and sub-bilabiate.

Distribution
This marine species occurs off New South Wales, Northern Territory, Queensland, Western Australia; in the tropical Indo-West Pacific; off Fiji, East India and Japan.

Species
Species within the genus Liotina include:
 Liotina crassibasis Smith, 1880
 Liotina crenata (Kiener, 1839)
 Liotina cycloma Tomlin, 1918
 Liotina fijiensis Pilsbry, 1934
 †Liotina gervilii (Defrance, 1818)
 Liotina hermanni (Dunker, 1869)
 Liotina montamarina Okutani, 2001
 Liotina peronii (Kiener, 1839)
 Liotina semiclathratula (Schrenck, 1862 in 1862-63)
 Liotina solidula (Gould, 1859)
 Liotina tantilla (A. Adams, 1863)
 †Liotina turua Maxwell, 1978

Further species 
 Liotina depressa(Reeve, 1843)
 Liotina loculosa (Gould, 1859)
 Liotina mayana (Tate)
 Liotina subquadrata T. Woods
 Liotina tasmanica  (Tenison-Woods, 1875)
 Liotina varicosa Reeve, 1843
 Liotina voyi Pilsbry and Vanatta, 1905
Species brought into synonymy
 Liotina armata A. Adams, 1861: synonym of Bathyliotina armata (A. Adams, 1861)
 Liotina australis Kiener, 1839: synonym of Austroliotia australis (Kiener, 1839)
 Liotina scalaroides Reeve, 1834: synonym of Liotinaria scalarioides Reeve, 1843

References

 Munier-Chalmas in Fischer, 1885 [[in P. Fischer] Manuel de conchyliologie et de paléontologie conchyliologique, (9): 831].
 Iredale, 1929, Memoirs of the Queensland Museum, 9(3): 274.
 Wilson, B. (1993). Australian Marine Shells. Prosobranch Gastropods. Kallaroo, WA : Odyssey Publishing. Vol.1 1st Edn pp. 1–408
 Williams S.T., Karube S. & Ozawa T. (2008) Molecular systematics of Vetigastropoda: Trochidae, Turbinidae and Trochoidea redefined. Zoologica Scripta 37: 483–506.

External links
 Charles F. Laseron, Revision of the Liotiidae of New South Wales, The Australia  Zoologist, Royal Zoological Society of new South Wales, v. 12, 1954

 
Liotiidae